Shirley Palmer (born January 26, 1943) is a former Democratic member of the Kansas House of Representatives, who represented the 4th district. She served from 2007 - 2011. Palmer ran for re-election in 2010, but was defeated by Republican Marty Read.

Palmer has undergraduate and master's degrees in education from Pittsburg State University.  Prior to being elected, she served as a teacher in Kansas for nearly 40 years, retiring in 2005.

She has also served as the National President of Pittsburg State University Alumni Association and has been married to her husband Ron for 45 years.  They have two sons and two grandchildren.

Issue positions
Palmer's main issue has been public education.  In addition she has worked to rebuild Southeast Kansas Communities damaged by flooding in 2007.

Committee membership
 Commerce and Labor
 Higher Education
 Agriculture and Natural Resources
 Joint Committee on Administrative Rules and Regulations.

Major donors
The top 5 donors to Palmer's 2008 campaign:
1. Bourbon Co Democratic Central Comm 	$1,000 	
2. Beachner Construction Co 	$1,000
3. Palmer, Ronald 	$1,000
4. Kansas Contractors Assoc 	$1,000 	
5. Kansas Medical Society 	$1,000

References

External links
 Kansas Legislature - Shirley Palmer
 Project Vote Smart profile
 Kansas Votes profile
 State Surge - Legislative and voting track record
 Follow the Money campaign contributions:
 2006, 2008

Democratic Party members of the Kansas House of Representatives
Living people
Women state legislators in Kansas
1943 births
Pittsburg State University alumni
21st-century American women politicians
21st-century American politicians